"Indian Reserve" is a historical term for the largely uncolonized land in North America that was claimed by France, ceded to Great Britain through the Treaty of Paris (1763) at the end of the Seven Years' War—also known as the French and Indian War—and set aside for the First Nations in the Royal Proclamation of 1763.  The British government had contemplated establishing an Indian barrier state in a portion of the reserve west of the Appalachian Mountains, bounded by the Ohio and Mississippi rivers and the Great Lakes.  British officials aspired to establish such a state even after the region was assigned to the United States in the Treaty of Paris (1783) ending the American Revolutionary War, but abandoned their efforts in 1814 after losing military control of the region during the War of 1812.

In the present-day United States, it consisted of all the territory north of Florida and New Orleans that was east of the Mississippi River and west of the Eastern Continental Divide in the Appalachian Mountains that formerly comprised the eastern half of Louisiana (New France). In modern Canada, it consisted of all the land immediately north of the Great Lakes but south of Rupert's Land belonging to the Hudson's Bay Company, as well as a buffer between the Province of Quebec and Rupert's Land stretching from Lake Nipissing to Newfoundland.

The Royal Proclamation of 1763 organized on paper much of the new territorial gains in three colonies in North America—East Florida, West Florida, and Quebec. The rest of the expanded British territory was left to Native Americans. The delineation of the Eastern Divide, following the Allegheny Ridge of the Appalachians, confirmed the limit to British settlement established at the 1758 Treaty of Easton, before Pontiac's War. Additionally, all European settlers in the territory (who were mostly French) were supposed to leave the territory or get official permission to stay. Many of the settlers moved to New Orleans and the French land on the west side of the Mississippi (particularly St. Louis), which in turn had been ceded secretly to Spain to become Louisiana (New Spain). However, many of the settlers remained and the British did not actively attempt to evict them.

In 1768, lands west of the Alleghenies and south of the Ohio were ceded to the colonies by the Cherokee at the Treaty of Hard Labour and by the Six Nations at the Treaty of Fort Stanwix. However, several other aboriginal nations, particularly Shawnee and Mingo, continued to inhabit and claim their lands that had been sold to the British by other tribes. This conflict led to Dunmore's War in 1774, ended by the Treaty of Camp Charlotte where these nations agreed to accept the Ohio River as the new boundary.

Restrictions on settlement were to become a flash point in the American Revolutionary War, following the Henderson Purchase of much of Kentucky from the Cherokee in 1775. The renegade Cherokee chief Dragging Canoe did not agree to the sale, nor did the Royal Government in London, which forbade settlement in this region. As an act of revolution in defiance of the crown, white pioneer settlers began pouring into Kentucky in 1776, opposed by Dragging Canoe in the Cherokee–American wars, which continued until 1794.

Timeline

Early settlements
1675 – Jacques Marquette founds a mission post at the Grand Village of the Illinois, now near Utica, Illinois
1680 – Iroquois massacre Grand Village
1680 – Fort Crevecoeur established at Peoria, Illinois
1696 – Cahokia, Illinois founded
1703 – Kaskaskia, Illinois founded
1717 – Illinois Country generally transferred from French Canada's jurisdiction to French Louisiana
1720 – Fort de Chartres established on Mississippi River near Prairie du Rocher, Illinois
1753 – Fort Presque Isle built near Erie, Pennsylvania
1754 – Fort Duquesne founded at Pittsburgh

French and Indian War
1754 – A French unit under Joseph Coulon de Jumonville has a letter for George Washington to leave French territory at Uniontown, Pennsylvania. Washington's militia ambush the French unit, and one account has it that Jumonville is killed by Seneca nation chief Tanacharison while in custody of Washington, igniting the French and Indian War.
1754 – Washington surrenders to Jumonville's half brother Louis Coulon de Villiers in the Battle of the Great Meadows in Fayette County, Pennsylvania. It is the only time Washington is to ever surrender in battle. He signs a document taking responsibility for the assassination of Jumonville and is released. The document is to be used to widen the war into the global Seven Years' War.
1762 – Following massive French defeats, the French secretly cede Louisiana on the west side of the Mississippi to its ally Spain in the Treaty of Fontainebleau (1762).
1763 – France cedes all lands in modern Canada and all lands east of the Mississippi in the Treaty of Paris (1763). Terms call for religious tolerance in Quebec and unrestricted emigration from French Canada for 18 months.
1763 – George III issues the Royal Proclamation setting aside the Indian Reserve and orders all settlers to leave the reserve and declares that the Crown rather than individual colonies has the right to negotiate settlements.

Push to settle the territory

1764 – Announcement that Spain has acquired the west bank of the Mississippi in Louisiana (New Spain).
1768 – Treaty of Fort Stanwix creates the Line of Property and Purchase Line in which the Iroquois cede much of Kentucky, West Virginia, and sections of western Pennsylvania and New York.
1772 – The Grand Ohio Company gets charter to settle the Vandalia colony south of the Ohio River much of which is now West Virginia.
1774 – Quebec Act expands the borders of the Province of Quebec to take all the Indian land in Canada in the buffer with Rupert's Land as well as all the land in territory north of the Ohio River including Illinois, Indiana, Michigan, Ohio, Wisconsin and a section of Minnesota. The act is considered one of the Intolerable Acts that contributed to the American Revolutionary War.
1775 – Transylvania (colony) founded in what is now Kentucky by Richard Henderson. Daniel Boone blazes Wilderness Trail through Cumberland Gap and founds Boonesborough.
1775 – Most of the Thirteen Colonies lay formal claim to the land extending the borders in straight lines west to the Mississippi.

American Revolutionary War
1778 – Larger conflicts in the Western theater of the American Revolutionary War begin with the Siege of Boonesborough in which Daniel Boone is initially captured and "adopted" by the Shawnee but eventually escapes to lead a successful American defense of Boonesborough.
1779 – American victories in the Illinois Campaign, Fort Laurens, Battle of Saint Louis (only battle west of the Mississippi in Spanish-held Louisiana).
1780 – British reassert control over the territory in Bird's invasion of Kentucky.
1781 – British victories in Lochry's Defeat and Long Run Massacre.
1781 – Spain completes rout of Britain in Florida in the Battle of Pensacola (1781).
1782 – British victory in the Battle of Blue Licks: ten months after Charles Cornwallis, 1st Marquess Cornwallis surrender in Siege of Yorktown.
1782 – American victory in the Ohio Valley at the Siege of Fort Henry; denying Britain control of the region.
1783 – Treaty of Paris (1783) ends the war and the British cede the territory south of modern-day Canada to the United States and Florida to Spain.
1795 – Boundaries between British North America and the United States are defined in the Jay Treaty, ending British occupation south of the Great Lakes following hostilities in the Northwest Indian War.

Dissolution
The area of the Indian Reserve in what is now the United States, after coming under firm control of the new country, was gradually settled by European Americans and divided into territories and states, starting with the Northwest Territory. Most (but not all) Indians in the area of the former Reserve were relocated further west under policies of Indian Removal. After the Louisiana Purchase, the Indian Intercourse Act of 1834 created an Indian Territory west of the Mississippi River as a destination, until it too was divided into territories and states for European American settlement, leaving only modern Indian Reservations inside the boundaries of U.S. states.

See also
 Indian barrier state
 Northwest Territory
 Old Southwest
 Southwest Territory
 Section Twenty-five of the Canadian Charter of Rights and Freedoms, which mentions the 1763 Royal Proclamation
 Aboriginal title statutes in the Thirteen Colonies
Ohio Country
Overhill Cherokee
Overmountain Men
Trans-Appalachia
Wilderness Road

References

Further reading
 Bemis, Samuel Flagg. Jay's Treaty: A Study in Commerce and Diplomacy (Macmillan, 1923)  ch 5 online
 Farrand, Max. "The Indian Boundary Line," American Historical Review (1905) 10#4 pp. 782–791  free in JSTOR
 Hatheway, G. G.  "The Neutral Indian Barrier State: A Project in British North American Policy, 1715-1815" (PhD dissertation,  University of Minnesota, 1957) 
 Ibbotson, Joseph D. "Samuel Kirkland, the Treaty of 1792, and the Indian Barrier State." New York History 19#.4 (1938): 374-391. in JSTOR
 Leavitt, Orpha E.  "British Policy on the Canadian Frontier, 1782-92: Mediation and an Indian Barrier State" Proceedings of the State Historical Society of Wisconsin (1916) Volume 63  pp 151–85 online
 Smith, Dwight L. "A North American Neutral Indian Zone: Persistence of a British Idea." Northwest Ohio Quarterly 61#2-4 (1989): 46-63.  traces idea from 1750s to 1814

External links
Map and background of territory from Canadiana.org
Map of Canadian Portion of Territory from Boston Public Library
 Proclamation of 1763 from UShistory.org (Independence Hall Association)

History of United States expansionism
Canada–United States relations
British North America
Colonial United States (British)
Former regions and territories of the United States
Native American history
Indian reserves
Aboriginal title in the United States
States and territories established in 1763
 
History of the Midwestern United States
Pre-statehood history of Illinois
Pre-statehood history of Indiana
Pre-statehood history of Michigan
Pre-statehood history of Minnesota
Pre-statehood history of Ohio
Pre-statehood history of Wisconsin
Midwestern United States